This article describes the history of cricket in India from the 2000–01 season to the present.

The Australia national cricket team toured India from February to April 2001 for a three-Test series and a five-match ODI series.

Events

The BCCI tinkered with the Duleep Trophy in the 2002–03 season.  The original zonal teams were replaced by five new teams called Elite A, Elite B, Elite C, Plate A and Plate B. These teams were constructed from the new Elite Group and Plate Group divisions which had been introduced into the Ranji Trophy that season. However, this format lasted for only one season as it was felt that the new teams lacked a sense of identity.  From the 2003–04 season, the five original zonal teams competed along with a sixth guest team which was a touring foreign team. The first guest team was England A in 2003–04.

The Indian Premier League has become very popular in India since its inaugural in 2008.

Mumbai (formerly Bombay) has continued its dominance of the domestic scene into the 21st century by winning the Ranji Trophy five times in the first decade.

Noted Indian cricketers in the 21st century include Sachin Tendulkar, Mahendra Singh Dhoni, Rahul Dravid, Sourav Ganguly, Anil Kumble, Virender Sehwag, Yuvraj Singh, VVS Laxman, Gautam Gambhir, Zaheer Khan, Harbhajan Singh and Virat Kohli.

India won the inaugural ICC World Twenty20 in 2007. Gautam Gambhir and Yuvraj Singh consistently performed for the team, while others chipping in occasionally.

India was the first Sub-continental team to win a Test match at the WACA in January 2008 against Australia.

Indian cricket team under the leadership of Mahendra Singh Dhoni and brilliant performances from Gautam Gambhir & Yuvraj Singh also went on to win the ICC Cricket World Cup 2011 and became the first team in history to win the Cup at home.

Domestic cricket

Ranji Trophy winners
 2000–01 – Baroda
 2001–02 – Railways
 2002–03 – Mumbai
 2003–04 – Mumbai
 2004–05 – Railways
 2005–06 – Uttar Pradesh
 2006–07 – Mumbai
 2007–08 – Delhi
 2008–09 – Mumbai
 2009–10 – Mumbai
 2010–11 – Rajasthan
 2011–12 – Rajasthan
 2012–13 – Mumbai
 2013–14 – Karnataka
 2014–15 – Karnataka

Duleep Trophy winners
 2000–01 – North Zone
 2001–02 – West Zone
 2002–03 – Elite C
 2003–04 – North Zone 
 2004–05 – Central Zone 
 2005–06 – West Zone
 2006–07 – North Zone 
 2007–08 – North Zone
 2008–09 – West Zone
 2009–10 – West Zone
 2010–11 – South Zone
 2011–12 – East Zone
 2012–13 – East Zone
 2013–14 – North Zone & South Zone Shared
 2014–15 – Central Zone

International tours of India

Zimbabwe 2000–01

 1st Test at Feroz Shah Kotla, Delhi – India won by 7 wickets
 2nd Test at Vidarbha Cricket Association Ground, Nagpur – match drawn

Australia 2000–01

 1st Test at Wankhede Stadium, Mumbai – Australia won by 10 wickets
 2nd Test at Eden Gardens, Calcutta – India won by 171 runs
 3rd Test at MA Chidambaram Stadium, Chepauk, Chennai – India won by 2 wickets

England 2001–02

 1st Test at Punjab Cricket Association Stadium, Mohali – India won by 10 wickets
 2nd Test at Sardar Patel Stadium, Motera, Ahmedabad – match drawn
 3rd Test at M Chinnaswamy Stadium, Bangalore – match drawn

Zimbabwe 2001–02

 1st Test at Vidarbha Cricket Association Ground, Nagpur – India won by an innings and 101 runs
 2nd Test at Feroz Shah Kotla, Delhi – India won by 4 wickets

West Indies 2002–03

 1st Test at Wankhede Stadium, Mumbai – India won by an innings and 112 runs
 2nd Test at MA Chidambaram Stadium, Chepauk, Chennai – India won by 8 wickets
 3rd Test at Eden Gardens, Kolkata – match drawn

New Zealand 2003–04

 1st Test at Sardar Patel Stadium, Motera, Ahmedabad – match drawn
 2nd Test at Punjab Cricket Association Stadium, Mohali – match drawn

Australia 2004–05

 1st Test at M Chinnaswamy Stadium, Bangalore – Australia won by 217 runs
 2nd Test at MA Chidambaram Stadium, Chepauk, Chennai – match drawn
 3rd Test at Vidarbha Cricket Association Ground, Nagpur – Australia won by 342 runs
 4th Test at Wankhede Stadium, Mumbai – India won by 13 runs

South Africa 2004–05

 1st Test at Modi Stadium, Kanpur – match drawn
 2nd Test at Eden Gardens, Kolkata – India won by 8 wickets

Pakistan 2004–05

 1st Test at Punjab Cricket Association Stadium, Mohali – match drawn
 2nd Test at Eden Gardens, Kolkata – India won by 195 runs
 3rd Test at M Chinnaswamy Stadium, Bangalore – Pakistan won by 168 runs

South Africa 2005–06
Limited overs tour only.

Sri Lanka 2005–06

 1st Test at MA Chidambaram Stadium, Chepauk, Chennai – match drawn
 2nd Test at Feroz Shah Kotla, Delhi – India won by 188 runs
 3rd Test at Sardar Patel Stadium, Motera, Ahmedabad – India won by 259 runs

England 2005–06

 1st Test at Vidarbha Cricket Association Ground, Nagpur – match drawn
 2nd Test at Punjab Cricket Association Stadium, Mohali – India won by 9 wickets
 3rd Test at Wankhede Stadium, Mumbai – England won by 212 runs

Sri Lanka 2006–07
Limited overs tour only.

West Indies 2006–07
Limited overs tour only.

External sources
 CricketArchive – Itinerary of Events in India

Further reading 

2007
2007